Descendants: Wicked World (also abbreviated simply as Wicked World) is a computer-animated short-form series based on the Disney Channel Original Movie Descendants. It premiered on September 18, 2015 on the Disney Channel and its digital platforms, including WATCH Disney Channel. It aired two seasons consisting of 33 episodes, and three specials, with its final special airing on March 3, 2017.

Series overview
{|class="wikitable plainrowheaders" style="text-align:center;"
!colspan="2" rowspan="2"|Season
!rowspan="2"|Episodes
!colspan="2"|Originally aired
|-
!First aired
!Last aired
|-
|style="background: #842CB1;"|
|[[List of Descendants: Wicked World episodes#Season 1 (2015–16)|1]]
|18
|
|
|-
|style="background: #FF5A86;"|
|[[List of Descendants: Wicked World episodes#Season 2 (2016–17)|2]]
|15
|
|
|-
|style="background: #FF69B4;"|
|[[List of Descendants: Wicked World episodes#Specials|Specials]]
|3
|
|
|}

Episode list

Season 1 (2015–16) Genie Chic & Neon Lights Ball

Season 2 (2016–17) Jewel-Bilee

Specials

References

External links
 

Lists of American children's animated television series episodes
Lists of Disney Channel television series episodes
Descendants (franchise)